Tak is a given name and a nickname. Notable people with the name include:

Given name
 Au Tak (1840–1920), Hong Kong entrepreneur
 Tak Fujimoto (born 1939), American cinematographer 
 Tak Matsumoto (born 1961), Japanese rock guitarist
 Tak Sakaguchi (born 1975), Japanese actor, director, fight choreographer and stuntman
 U Tak (1262–1342), Korean Neo-Confucian scholar

Nickname
 Takashi Tak Fujimoto (born 1939), American cinematographer
 Takahiro Tak Matsumoto (born 1961), Japanese guitarist, singer, songwriter and record producer
 Takeshi Tak Shindo (1922–2002), Japanese-American exotica musician

Masculine given names
Lists of people by nickname
Hypocorisms